Joseph E. Edsall (March 29, 1789 in Hamburg, New Jersey – February 17, 1865 in Hamburg, New Jersey) was an American Democratic Party politician, who represented  in the United States House of Representatives from 1845 to 1847, and the  from 1847 to 1849.

Biography
Edsall was born in Rudeville, near Hamburg, New Jersey in 1789, and attended the common schools. He engaged in mercantile pursuits, and operated a distillery and a tannery. He served as county clerk, was a member of the New Jersey General Assembly, and served as judge of the Court of Common Pleas.

Edsall was elected as a Democrat to the Twenty-ninth and Thirtieth Congresses, serving in office from March 4, 1845 to March 3, 1849. He died in Hamburg in 1865, and was interred there in the Baptist Burying Ground.

External links

Joseph E. Edsall at The Political Graveyard

1789 births
1865 deaths
County clerks in New Jersey
Democratic Party members of the United States House of Representatives from New Jersey
People from Hamburg, New Jersey
Politicians from Sussex County, New Jersey
Democratic Party members of the New Jersey General Assembly
New Jersey state court judges
19th-century American politicians
19th-century American judges